Caymanas Park is Jamaica's only race track.

It was historically a sugarcane estate in the Colony of Jamaica. It was originally owned by the Ellis family, including George Ellis and Charles Ellis, 1st Baron Seaford, who made substantial profits from sugar and slavery.

It is mentioned in the Pioneers' 1969 song "Long Shot (Kick The Bucket)", which contains the line "What a weeping and a wailing down at Caymanas Park".

Gangster Dennis Barth, known as "Copper", was killed in a shootout with police at the park.

See also
Sport in Jamaica

References

External links
Official website
Aerial view.

Year of establishment missing
Horse racing venues in Jamaica
Buildings and structures in Saint Catherine Parish